Pearly gates is an informal name for the gateway to Heaven according to some Christian denominations. It is inspired by the description of the New Jerusalem in : "The twelve gates were twelve pearls, each gate being made from a single pearl."

The image of the gates in popular culture is a set of large gold, white or wrought-iron gates in the clouds, guarded by Saint Peter (the keeper of the "keys to the kingdom"). Those not fit to enter heaven are denied entrance at the gates, and descend into Hell. In some versions of this imagery, Peter looks up the deceased's name in a book, before opening the gate.

The pearly gates provide the background for a joke cycle: "the premise of these jokes is that admission is not automatic but that the criteria for admission are somewhat arbitrary."

References

Heaven in Christianity
Christian mythology
Christian terminology
Book of Revelation
Pearls